Kitty Ko may refer to:
 Kitty Ko Sin Tung, a Hong Kong artist
 A character in Sidekick